Daniel "Danny" Atar (born 5 January 1958) is an Israeli politician.

Biography
Daniel Atar was born in Afula, Israel, to Jewish parents who had immigrated from Morocco in 1956. During his IDF national service he served in the Golani Brigade. He fought in the 1982 Lebanon War. He continued to serve in the army reserves, becoming a lieutenant colonel.

Gilboa Regional Council
In 1994 he was elected leader of Gilboa Regional Council. While serving in that role he ran for the interim leadership of the Labor Party in 2003, winning 21.9% of the vote. In 2009, Atar was detained and investigated along with five other municipal workers for fraudulently receiving goods and mismanagement of campaign funds.

Knesset
He was placed 16th on the Labor Party list for the 2013 Knesset elections, a spot reserved for the agricultural sector, but did not become a Knesset member as the party won only 15 seats. Although he was next in line to replace Binyamin Ben-Eliezer following his retirement from politics, he gave up his seat for Raleb Majadele.

Prior to the 2015 elections he was placed 15th on the Zionist Union list, an alliance of Labor and Hatnuah. He was elected to the Knesset as the alliance won 24 seats.

Jewish National Fund
In October 2015, Atar was elected head of the Jewish National Fund. He was replaced in the Knesset by Yael Cohen Paran, the head of the Green Movement. In 2020, Atar was accused of being party to the illegal spending of 100 million shekels to purchase lands in the West Bank, without the permission of the Jewish National Fund Board.

Personal life
Atar is married with three children and lives in Gan Ner. After years of enforcement efforts, he was fined in 2020 and forced to return public lands adjacent to his Gan Ner home, that he had commandeered and used to construct an illegal private swimming pool.

References

External links

1958 births
Living people
Israeli Labor Party politicians
Zionist Union politicians
Israeli people of Moroccan-Jewish descent
Israeli Mizrahi Jews
Israeli Sephardi Jews
Jewish Israeli politicians
Mayors of places in Israel
Members of the 20th Knesset (2015–2019)
People from Afula